The 2011 IIHF World Women's U18 Championship Division I tournament was played in Dmitrov, Russia, from 28 March to 3 April 2011. The hosts Russia won the tournament and after a year they returned to the top division. There was no relegation per se; both France and Kazakhstan had to enter the qualification tournament for the 2012 Division I championship.

Final standings

Results
All times are local (Moscow Time – UTC+04).

Scoring leaders
List shows the top skaters sorted by points, then goals.
GP = Games played; G = Goals; A = Assists; Pts = Points; +/− = Plus/minus; PIM = Penalties in minutes; POS = Position

Leading goaltenders
Only the top six goaltenders, based on save percentage, who have played 40% of their team's minutes are included in this list.
TOI = Time on ice (minutes:seconds); GA = Goals against; GAA = Goals against average; Sv% = Save percentage; SO = Shutouts

References

External links 
 IIHF.com

IIHF World Women's U18 Championship – Division I
World
World
International ice hockey competitions hosted by Russia